Margaret Beacham (née Moir; born 28 September 1946) is a British female former middle-distance runner. Her greatest achievement was a gold medal in the 1500 metres at the 1971 European Athletics Indoor Championships, where she held off Soviet athlete Lyudmila Bragina (Olympic champion a year later) to set a world indoor best of 4:17.2 minutes.

At national level, she first came to prominence with a runner-up finish in the mile run at the 1967 AAA Indoor Championships. She was runner-up again over 1500 m in 1970 before going on to win the national title in 1971, as well as an 800 metres title in 1971. She was twice a winner at the South of England Championships, taking the 1970 800 m title and 1500 m title in 1972.

Granddaughter of Gunner Moir, British Heavyweight Boxing Champion, who fought for the World title against Canadian Tommy Burns in 1907.

International competitions

National titles
AAA Indoor Championships
800 m: 1972
1500 m: 1971

See also
List of European Athletics Indoor Championships medalists (women)

References

Living people
1946 births
English female middle-distance runners
World record setters in athletics (track and field)